Tinoliodes dehanna is a moth in the family Erebidae. It was described by Arnold Pagenstecher in 1885. It is found in Sundaland in Southeastern Asia. The habitat consists of rain forests from the lowlands up to 1.500 meters.

References

Moths described in 1885
Callimorphina